Alfonso Díaz is a Colombian director and host with the international network, Canal Nuestra Tele Internacional. He also serves as the entertainment correspondent for NTN24, the international news station geared to Spanish speaking audiences around the world.  His show "Tenemos Que Hablar" reaches more than 20 countries.

Diaz has interviewed countless personalities in many diverse settings - on the red carpet, at press junkets, concerts and openings.  These include Julianne Moore, Kristen Stewart, George Clooney, Robert de Niro, Patrick Stewart, James Franco, Laverne Cox and Sofia Vergara amongst others.

References

External links
Canalnuestratele.com
:es:NTN24

Year of birth missing (living people)
Living people
Colombian journalists
Male journalists
Colombian television presenters